Vladislav Borisovich Galkin  (25 December 1971 – 25 February 2010) was a highly popular Russian actor who starred in fifty seven films including several TV serials, such as Spetsnaz (2002), The Master and Margarita (2005–2006) and Dikari (2006).

Galkin studied acting at the Boris Shchukin Theatre Institute from 1988 to 1992, then studied film directing at the All-Union State Institute of Cinematography in the 1990 where his teacher was Vladimir Khotinenko.

On 27 February 2010, Galkin was found dead in his apartment, and the cause of death was said to be cardiac arrest. However, according to his family and friends, he was murdered based on evidence indicating the presence of other people in his room just before his death and the disappearance of $130,000 from his apartment. The police dismissed this version. Galkin's death was mourned by many who demanded finding those responsible for his death.

Colleagues have said Galkin was suffering from a drinking problem. In 2009, he was charged with hooliganism using a weapon and non-life-threatening violence against a law enforcement official, after an attack on a police lieutenant at a bar in July. In December, he was convicted to a suspended sentence of 14 months.

For millions of viewers, especially those outside Russia, Galkin is remembered as the poet Ivan Bezdomny (Homeless) in Vladimir Bortko's much lauded film version of Mikhail Bulgakov's epic novel The Master and Margarita. In the Bortko film series, the character Bezdomny witnesses the death of his friend. When he tries to tip off the authorities to the improbable sequence of events, their reaction is to lock him up in a mental hospital. Subsequent events vindicate Bezdomny, and he eventually comes to be at peace with the suffering he was caused, in part thanks to his increased understanding gained in visits from the Master.

Selected filmography
 The Rifleman of the Voroshilov Regiment (1999)  as Alexey Podberyozkin, local policeman
 Truckers (2001) as Alexander "Sashok" Korovin, truck driver
 In August of 1944 (2001) as Senior Lieutenant Yevgeny Tamantsev 
 Spetsnaz (2002)  as Senior Lieutenant 'Yakut' Urmanov
 72 Meters (2004) as Senior Warrant Officer Mikhaylov
 The Fall of the Empire (2005) as Nikitin, chief of counterintelligence
 The Master and Margarita (2005)  as Ivan Bezdomny, poet
 Dikari (2006) as Chorny, mechanic and leader-production

References

External links

1971 births
2010 deaths
Burials in Troyekurovskoye Cemetery
Russian male child actors
Russian male film actors
Russian male television actors
Soviet male child actors
Honored Artists of the Russian Federation
Recipients of the Nika Award
Russian television presenters
United Russia politicians
21st-century Russian politicians